Count Alexei Pavlovich Ignatiev was a Russian political figure. His brother Nicholas Pavlovich Ignatiev was Chairman of the Committee of Ministers between 1872 and 1880.

On December 14, 1905, the New York Times reported rumors, circulating in St. Petersburg, that he was arrested on suspicion of fomenting rebellion against the czar.

Ignatiev was shot to death by members of the Socialist-Revolutionary Party in 1906.

Main military offices
Commander of the 2nd Her Majesty Courland Leib Uhlan Regiment (from 1871)
Commander of the 1st Brigade of the 1st Cavalry Guards Division (from 1874)
Major-General (from 1875)
Head of the Guards Corps Staff (from 1881)
Cavalry General (from 1896)

References

 Архивы России. Летопись событий. Выставки

Russian nobility
Imperial Russian Army generals
Politicians of the Russian Empire
Members of the State Council (Russian Empire)
1842 births
1906 deaths
People from Tver
Russian monarchists
Governors-General of Kiev